2013 is the second year for Super Fight League, an Indian-based mixed martial arts (MMA) promotion. Whilst the SFL began holding events from February 22 with their first SFL Contenders event, which are untelevised events that take place in the SFL Training Centre as a way to build up the fighters before bringing forward to a television audience, the promotion made their televised return with SFL 14 on March 29, which was headlined by two title fights between Xavier Foupa-Pokam and John Troyer for the middleweight title, and Sanja Sucevic and Colleen Schneider for the women's flyweight title. The same event was also their first on ESPN Star Sports in India.

List of events
Super Fight League has scheduled several fights cards throughout 2013:

Event summaries

SFL Contenders 1
Results

SFL Contenders 2
Results

SFL Contenders 3
Results

SFL Contenders 4
Results

SFL Contenders 5
Results

SFL Contenders 6
Results

SFL Contenders 7
Results

SFL Contenders 8
Results

SFL Contenders 9
Results

SFL Contenders 10
Results

See also
 Super Fight League

References

External links
 Super Fight League official site

SFL
Mixed martial arts events